Aïn El Hadjar is a town and commune in Saïda Province in northwestern Algeria. It is the district capital of Aïn El Hadjar District

References

Communes of Saïda Province